Hermann Pleuer (5 April 1863, in Schwäbisch Gmünd – 6 January 1911, in Stuttgart) was a German Impressionist and landscape artist who is best known for his paintings of the Royal Württemberg State Railways.

Biography
He was the son of a goldsmith and jeweler. After initial studies at the Stuttgart School of Applied Arts (1879–1881) and the State Academy of Fine Arts Stuttgart (1881–1883) he completed his studies at the Academy of Fine Arts Munich.

He returned to Stuttgart in 1886 and led a bohemian life style, painting nudes and scenes from the local night life. By the end of the 1880s, he had  become fascinated with industrial technology and what was called the "Rausch der Geschwindigkeit" (Thrill of Speed), As a result, he turned to painting the trains and train stations of the State Railways.

His work was supported by a patron, Franz Baron von Koenig-Fachsenfeld (1866-1918), who bought many of his paintings and placed them in the family castle. Later, he became a member of the Deutscher Künstlerbund.

He died from tuberculosis at the early age of 47. There is a Hermann-Pleuer-Weg in Ostfildern and a Hermann-Pleuer-Straße in Stuttgart.

In 1982 the Baron's son, Reinhard, a well-known inventor and automotive engineer, created a foundation to preserve his father's castle and open it to public access. Pleuer's works may also be seen at the Kunstmuseum Stuttgart.

Selected paintings

References

Further reading 
 Gabriele Kiesewetter: Hermann Pleuer (1863–1911). Leben und Werk. Die Entdeckung der Geschwindigkeit, Konrad Theiss Verlag, Stuttgart 2000, 
 Roland Schurig: „Die Poesie der Schienenwelt so lebendig empfunden“ Der Impressionist Hermann Pleuer (1863–1911), Momente, Beiträge zur Landeskunde von Baden-Württemberg, 1/2007
 Stadt Aalen: Pleuer und die Eisenbahn, Stuttgart 1978, Ausstellungskatalog.
 Isabel Grüner: Impressionismus im deutschen Südwesten. Otto Reiniger, Hermann Pleuer, Heinrich von Zügel, Christian Landenberger. Kunststiftung Hohenkarpfen, Kunstverein Schwarzwald-Baar-Heuberg, Hausen ob Verena 1997, .

External links 

 ArtNet: Works by Pleuer
 

1863 births
1911 deaths
Landscape painters
19th-century German painters
19th-century German male artists
German male painters
20th-century German painters
20th-century German male artists